Yanga Xakalashe (born 16 August 1983 in East London, South Africa) is a South African rugby union player, currently playing with the . His regular position is prop.

Career

He was a member of the  side that played in the 2005 Under-21 Provincial Championship. The following season, he was included on the bench for the ' senior side for their 2006 Vodacom Cup match against . However, he failed to make an appearance in a 9–18 defeat to their Western Cape rivals.

He played club rugby over the next few seasons and it wasn't until eight years later that he got another chance at provincial level; he was one of several amateur players brought into the  provincial set-up at the start of 2014 after the professional side was declared bankrupt. He came on as a replacement ten minutes into the second half to make his first class debut, aged .

He was also named in their squad for the 2014 Currie Cup qualification tournament, with a spot in the 2014 Currie Cup Premier Division up for grabs for the winners. His first Currie Cup start came in their Round One match against eventual winners  in a 5–52 defeat. In his next match, against  in East London, Xakalashe scored his first senior try, a consolation try in a 12–37 defeat. A 103–15 win for the home team ensured the competition ended in disastrous fashion for the Bulldogs, who lost all six their matches.

Xakalashe was retained for 2015, being included in the Border Bulldogs squad for the 2015 Vodacom Cup competition.

References

1983 births
Living people
Border Bulldogs players
Rugby union players from East London, Eastern Cape
Rugby union props
South African rugby union players